Abubakar Damian Asenga (born June 13, 1983), is a Tanzanian politician presently serves as a Chama Cha Mapinduzi's Member of Parliament for Kilombero Constituency since November 2020. He was District Administrative Secretary (DAS) of Rombo District in Kilimanjaro.

See also
 Adolf Mkenda

References

External links

Living people
1983 births
People from Kilimanjaro Region
Open University of Tanzania alumni
University of Dar es Salaam alumni
21st-century Tanzanian politicians
Chama Cha Mapinduzi politicians
Chama Cha Mapinduzi MPs
Tanzanian MPs 2020–2025